Discography for jazz pianist Cecil Taylor.

Discography

As leader

Compilations 
 In Berlin '88 (FMP, 1989)[11CD] – recorded in 1988
 Crossing (Jazz Hour, 1989) – recorded in 1966, 73, 74. two tracks with Jimmy Lyons, Alan Silva and Andrew Cyrille plus four tracks solo piano; contains excerpts from Student Studies, Indent, and Silent Tongues.
 Mixed with Roswell Rudd (Impulse!, 1998)

As sideman 
 John Coltrane, Stereo Drive (United Artists, 1959) – rec. 1958
 Gil Evans Orchestra, Into the Hot (Impulse!, 1962) – rec. 1961. features tracks also released on Mixed.
 Jazz Composer's Orchestra, The Jazz Composer's Orchestra (JCOA, 1968) – featured on 2 tracks
 Friedrich Gulda, Nachricht vom Lande (Brain, 1976)[2LP] – 3 tracks
 Tony Williams, The Joy of Flying (Columbia, 1978) – 1 track
 Art Ensemble of Chicago, Thelonious Sphere Monk (DIW, 1991) – rec. 1990. 3 tracks.

 
Jazz discographies
Discographies of American artists